Mary Lynn Washington (born May 20, 1962) is an American politician from Baltimore, Maryland. A Democrat, she was first elected in to the Maryland House of Delegates in 2010 to represent the 43rd legislative district. In 2018, she was elected to the Maryland Senate where she now serves.

Background
Born in Philadelphia to two healthcare professionals, Washington is a graduate of the Philadelphia High School for Girls. She earned her Bachelor of Arts from Antioch University in Philadelphia in 1989. She then moved to Baltimore to attend Johns Hopkins University, where she earned a Master of Arts in 1992 and a Doctor of Philosophy in 1997, both in sociology. In 2012, Washington completed Harvard University's John F. Kennedy School of Government program for Senior Executives in State and Local Government as a David Bohnett LGBTQ Victory Institute Leadership Fellow.

She began her professional career in academia, teaching at Lehigh University from 1995 to 2000 and then completed a post-doctoral fellowship at the Populations Studies Center at the University of Pennsylvania from 2000 to 2001. Subsequently, she worked as the Director of the HousingStat Office at the Housing Authority of Baltimore City, Interim Director for the Baltimore Neighborhood Indicators Alliance in 2005, Adjunct Faculty Member at the Maryland Institute College of Art and Assistant Director at the Urban Resources Initiative from 2006 to 2008, Associate Director at the Parks & People Foundation, and a Maryland Public Policy Conflict Resolution Fellow at the Center for Dispute Resolution at the University of Maryland School of Law in 2013.

In 2010, Washington was elected to the Maryland House of Delegates and made history by becoming the first openly LGBT African-American elected official in Maryland — and only the second such state legislator in the country.

Washington is a member of the Maryland Complete Count Committee and the Criminal Justice Information Advisory Board and is a member of the part-time faculty at the Maryland Institute College of Art where she teaches public policy and sociology.

In the legislature
Senator Mary Washington currently serves on the Senate Judicial Proceedings Committee and has the following current assignments:

 Senate Chair, Joint Committee on Children, Youth, and Families
 Senate Chair, Joint Committee on Ending Homelessness
 Chair, Task Force to Study Crime Classification and Penalties
 Member, Maryland Legislative Black Caucus
 Associate Member, Maryland Legislative Latino Caucus
 Member, Women Legislators of Maryland

Political career
Prior to being elected to the Maryland Senate, Washington represented the 43rd District in the Maryland House of Delegates. As Delegate, she served on both the House Appropriations Committee and the House Ways and Means Committee. She also served as House Chair of the Joint Committee on Homelessness and as a member of the Joint Committee on Children, Youth, and Families, the Regional Revitalization Task Force, the Tax Credit Evaluation Committee, and the Unaccompanied Homeless Youth Task Force. From 2015 to 2016, Washington served as the Deputy Majority Whip.

2006 Run for Maryland House of Delegates – 43rd District 
Washington first ran for the House of Delegates in 2006, seeking one of three seats in Baltimore's 43rd district. She was one of six Democrats to run in the district. The field included all three incumbents: Curt Anderson (first elected 1982), Ann Marie Doory (first elected 1986) and Maggie McIntosh (first elected 1992).

Washington finished fourth in the Democratic primary held on September 12, 2006, behind the three incumbents.
{| class="wikitable"
|-
!Name
!Votes
!Percent
!Outcome
|-
|- 
|Curt Anderson (incumbent)
|10,390 
|  25.8%
|   Won
|-
|- 
|Maggie McIntosh (incumbent)
|9,540 
|  23.7%
|   Won
|-
|- 
|Ann Marie Doory (incumbent)
|8,726
|  21.6%
|   Won
|-
|- 
|Mary L. Washington
|7,347
|  18.2%
|   Lost
|-
|- 
|Michael V. Dobson
|3,074
|  7.6%
|   Lost
|-
|- 
|Mike Miller
|1,230  
|  3.1%
|   Lost
|}

2010 Maryland House of Delegates – 43rd District 
Washington mounted a second bid for the House of Delegates in 2010, also in the 43rd district. This time, only two incumbents were seeking re-election: Ann Marie Doory had retired in July 2010 and her appointed successor, Scherod C. Barnes, was not running for a full term. Once again, six Democrats filed for three seats but Washington now had the support of the other incumbents – she joined the slate of Sen. Joan Carter Conway and Dels. Maggie McIntosh and Curt Anderson. All four of the slate's members won the primary, with Washington winning by a comfortable margin.
{| class="wikitable"
|-
!Name
!Votes
!Percent
!Outcome
|-
|- 
|Maggie McIntosh (incumbent)
|9,780 
|  28.2%
|   Won
|-
|- 
|Curt Anderson (incumbent)
|9,739
|  28.1%
|   Won
|-
|- 
|Mary L. Washington
|8,705
|  25.1%
|   Won
|-
|- 
|Kelly Fox
|3,740
|  10.8%
|   Lost
|-
|- 
|Rodney C. Burris
|1,880
|  5.4%
|   Lost
|-
|- 
|Leon Winthly Hector, Sr.
|809 
|  2.3%
|   Lost
|}

In the general election, the three Democratic nominees faced no opposition in a district that's overwhelmingly Democratic. They were elected unopposed.

2014 Run for Maryland House of Delegates – 43rd District 

{| class="wikitable"
|-
!Name
!Votes
!Percent
!Outcome
|- 
|Curt Anderson, Democratic
|23,046
|  34.1%
|   Won
|- 
|Maggie McIntosh, Democratic
|22,310
|  33%
|   Won
|- 
|Mary L. Washington, Democratic
|21,800
|  32.3%
|   Won
|- 
|no Republican filed
|
|
|
|- 
|Other Write-Ins
|267
|  .4%
|   Lost
|- 
|Greg Dorsey (Write-In)
|128
|  .2%
|   Lost
|}

2018 Run for Maryland State Senate - 43rd District
In a close primary election against the incumbent Joan Carter Conway, Mary Washington won by about 500 votes.

2020 mayoral campaign
Washington was a candidate in the 2020 Baltimore mayoral election, but announced the suspension of her campaign in March 2020, so that she could focus her energies upon helping her constituents respond to the Coronavirus disease 2019 pandemic.

References

External links
Biography courtesy of the Maryland State Archives
Campaign website
Radio interview explaining her opposition to legislation enabling Johns Hopkins University to establish a private police force.

Living people
Lesbian politicians
LGBT state legislators in Maryland
LGBT people from Pennsylvania
Democratic Party members of the Maryland House of Delegates
Women state legislators in Maryland
Antioch University alumni
Johns Hopkins University alumni
African-American state legislators in Maryland
African-American women in politics
Lehigh University faculty
American Presbyterians
1962 births
Politicians from Philadelphia
Politicians from Baltimore
21st-century American politicians
21st-century American women politicians
Democratic Party Maryland state senators
American women academics
21st-century African-American women
21st-century African-American politicians
20th-century African-American people
20th-century African-American women